The Volunteer Shield was a trophy awarded to the primary supporter group of the Tennessean club in the National Premier Soccer League with the best head-to-head record. It was inaugurated in 2015, and awarded retroactively to Chattanooga FC for the best record during the 2014 season. The shield derives its name from the state's nickname, the "Volunteer State," and is made of Tulip Poplar, the official state tree of Tennessee.

Teams 
Originally contested between three teams, at the shield's peak it was contested between four clubs within the NPSL's Southeastern Conference. Chattanooga FC had been the longest standing member of the competition before it left the league following the 2019 season.

As of 2020, only one team in the NPSL (Inter Nashville) is based in the state of Tennessee.

Previous results

2014

2015

2016

2017 

For 2017, the Southeast Conference was split in two with Knoxville Force competing in the East Division while Chattanooga FC, Memphis City FC, and new team Inter Nashville FC all competed in the West Division. To accommodate for this, the shield organizers divided the four teams into two groups:

Chattanooga vs Inter Nashville
Memphis City vs Knoxville Force

The results from the two matches within each group would determine who wins that group. Once the two group winners emerge, the points earned in the two regular season matches the group winners played against one another would determine the overall winner. If those points were tied, or if the two group winners didn’t play in the regular season, the first tiebreaker would be the results of a playoff match between the group winners. If the group winners did not meet in the playoffs, then the overall results stand tied between the group winners and both would be listed a co-champions.

Chattanooga and Knoxville both won their groups on tie-breakers but since neither team played one-another in the regular season, the shield champion would be decided by tie-breaker whether that be a in a playoff match between the two sides or PointPerGame average vs other Tennessee teams. In the first playoff round, which Knoxville had a bye in due to winning the East Division, Chattanooga fell to Nashville, 2-1, meaning the Knoxville Force won the shield based on PPG (1.5 to 1.0).

Group A 

Tiebreakers: 1) Goal Diff in the two group matches; 2) Goals Scored in the two group matches; 3) Points earned in Southeast Conference play; 4) Goal Differential in Southeast Conference matches; 5) Coin-flip

Group B 

Tiebreakers: 1) Goal Diff in the two group matches; 2) Goals Scored in the two group matches; 3) Points earned in Southeast Conference play; 4) Goal Differential in Southeast Conference matches; 5) Coin-flip

Other 2017 matches between Tennessee teams

2018

2019

See also 
 Cascadia Cup a three-team rivalry for MLS teams in the Pacific Northwest
 Southern Derby a multi-team rivalry for soccer clubs in the South Atlantic states

References 

Soccer in Tennessee
Soccer rivalries in the United States
2015 establishments in Tennessee